Gujarati Pashtuns/Pathans are a group of Pashtuns who are settled in the region of Gujarat in western India. They now form a distinct community of Gujarati and Urdu/Hindi speaking Muslims. They are distributed throughout the state, but live mainly in Ahmedabad, Rajkot, Junagadh, Surat, Bhavnagar, Panchamahal, Koth, Kotha, Borsad, Kheda, Banaskantha, Bharuch, Gandhinagar, Sabarkantha, Vadodara and Mehsana. They mainly speak Urdu/Hindi with many Pashto loanwords, but most of them have been Indianized so some may have Gujarati as their first language as well, few elders in the community still speak Pashto. Common tribes include Babi or Babai (Pashtun tribe), Niazi, Khan, Bangash, Durrani, and Yousafzai.

History and origin

The Pathans arrived in Gujarat during the Middle Ages onwards, as soldiers in the armies of the various Hindu and Muslim rulers of the region. Historical evidence suggests that the earliest settlement of the Pashtuns was during the rule of Mohammad Tughlak in the 14th century, when military colonies were established. It is also possible that many accompanied and formed part of the army of Mahmud of Ghazni in his invasions of Gujarat in 1024 AD.(Early Ghaznavid History and Artifacts in Hansot and Tadkeshwar settlements in Surat District) Quite a few arrived during the rule of Mahmud Begada, and over the course of time spread over the entire the state of Gujarat. During the period of Mughal rule over Gujarat, there was further settlement of Pashtuns. With the breakup of the Mughal Empire, the Babi or  Babai (Pashtun tribe) and Jalori Pathans became rulers of the princely states of Junagadh and Palanpur. The 19th century saw a further settlement of Pashtuns, mainly Ghilzais Tanoli from Afghanistan, with many settling in the cities of Ahmedabad, Surat and Khambhat. They are divided into twelve lineages, the main ones being the Babi or Babai, Samra, Khanzada, Yousafzai, Lohani, Mandori, Suleiymani, Surat Turk, Miani and Zadran. The bulk of the Gujarat Pathans belong to the Jalori tribr.

Princely States

The Pathans of Gujarat were rulers of a number of princely states, the main ones being Balasinor, Radhanpur, Palanpur and Junagadh.

Balasinor

Balasinor (also referred to as Vadasinor) is a town located in the Kheda district, in Gujarat, India. Balasinor State was a princely state of the Babi dynasty and was created on 28 September 1758 by the Junagadh State Babi Dynasty, of which famous Bollywood actress Parveen Babi is a descendant.  The current nawab is HH Nawab Babi Shri Muhammed Salabat Khanji II.

Junagadh

Nawabs of Babi dynasty:
 1730–1758: Mohammad Bahadur Khanji I or Mohammad Sher Khan Babi
 1759–1774: Mohammad Mahabat Khanji I
 1774–1811: Mohammad Hamid Khanji I
 1811–1839: Mohammad Bahadur Khanji I
 1840–1851: Mohammad Hamid Khanji II
 1851–1882: Mohammad Mahabat Khanji II
 1882–1892: Mohammad Bahadur Khanji II 
 1892–1911: Mohammad Rasul Khanji (1858–1911)
 1911–1948: Muhammad Mahabat Khanji III (1898–1959)

The East India Company took control of the state in 1818, the present old town Junagadh, developed during the 19th and 20th centuries, is one of the former princely states which were outside but under the suzerainty of British India.
Some of the Babi Pashtun  who were the rulers and from the lineage of Junagadh state still lives in Gujarat. The main ones were the rulers of Ranpur Sorath, Devgam, Matiyana, Bamangadh and Bantva.

Palanpur 

Palanpur was the seat of Palanpur State, a princely state ruled by the Lohani/Hetani, (Jalori) dynasty of Afghans. It was overrun soon afterwards by the Marathas; the Lohanis followed the trend of seeking recourse in the British East India Company against them and finally entered the subsidiary alliance system in 1817, along with all other neighbouring states.

The town of Palanpur housed a population of only 8000 people that year. The state commanded a revenue of approximately Rs.50,000/- per year. It was traversed by the main line of the Rajputana-Malwa Railway, and contained the British cantonment of Deesa. Wheat, rice and sugar-cane were the chief products. Watered by the Sabarmati river, the state was heavily forested in its northern reached (the present-day Jessore sanctuary) but undulating and open in the south and east.

Radhanpur

The State of Radhanpur was established in 1753 by Jawan Mard Khan II, son of Jawan Mard Khan I. Later, Radhanpur city became the capital of the princely state of Radhanpur under Palanpur Agency of Bombay Presidency. It was a walled town, known for its export trade in rapeseed, grain and cotton.

Radhanpur came under British control in 1813. Even so, the Nawabs minted their own coins until 1900, when the state adopted the Indian currency; a particularly forward-looking Nawab briefly introduced decimalization, with 100 fulus equaling one rupee. Still, India did not decimalize its currency until 1957.

The state has been held by the Babi family since 1753, when Jawan Mard Khan II obtained the districts of Pattan, Vadnagar, Sami, Munjpur, Tharad, Visalnagar, Kheralu, Radhanpur, Tharwarah, and Vijapur from the Marathas. They were related to the ruling houses of Junagadh and Balasinor, two other Gujarat states. After the death of Bismillah Khan in 1895, Radhanpur was put in the charge of British officers who took over the treasury and the administration until the nawab's successor, who was a minor, came of age. In 1907 Haji Muhammad Sher Khanji was invested with full powers, but he died in 1910, and was succeeded by his brother. The state covered , with a population (1901) of 61,403.

The Diwan of Palanpur enjoyed a Salute of 13 guns and the Nawab of Radhanpur enjoyed a Salute of 11 guns.

Present circumstances

A process of indigenization has occurred, and the Pathans are now indistinguishable from other Gujarati Muslims. With the coming of independence from British rule in 1947, the community has seen the disappearance of their traditional occupations. The greatest concentration of Pathans is in the city of Baroda, followed by Kaira, Mehsana and Banaskantha. They also have their own villages, and are mainly cultivators. Many are now employed by the State transport corporation as Mechanics, while others have opened garages. As a largely urban community, many are now employed in the textile industry. They are Sunni Muslims, and like other Gujarati Muslims, have their own caste association, the Gujarat Pathan Jamat.

Sub-Divisions

The Pashtuns of Gujarat include three distinct endogamous communities, the Pathan Khanzada, the Babi or Babai (Pashtun tribe)  and the Sama.

Babi Pathans

The Babi or Babai (Pashtun tribe) arrived in Gujarat during the rule of Mughal Empire. After the collapse of the Mughal Empire, the Babi were involved in a struggle with the Maratha Gaekwads for the control of Gujarat. While the Maratha were successful in establishing overall control over Gujarat, the Babi remained masters of the princely states of Junagadh, Radhanpur, Balasinor, Bantva Manavadar etc. They are found throughout north Gujarat and Saurashtra. Most Babi, barring the princely lineages, are in modest circumstances. Many are petty landowners, but there is marked urbanization among the Babi. The Babi are endogamous, but there are cases of marriages with the Chauhan and Behlim communities, and they accept daughters from the Shaikhs and Sunni Bohras.

Kabulis

The term Kabuli literally means any inhabitant of the city of Kabul in Afghanistan. In Gujarat, the term was applied to any Pashtun who arrived in Gujarat during the 19th century, the majority of whom were Ghilzais. Historically, the community were traders, buying horses from Kathiawar and selling them in Rajputana and Deccan. They are found mainly in Ahmedabad, and speak Hindustani as well as Gujarati. Some older members of the community can still speak Pashto. To a great extent, they form a distinct community, marrying among themselves, little interacting with other Gujarat Pathans.

Sama Pathans of Borsad town

The Sama are Yousafzai Pathans, who trace their ancestry to the village of Sama or Samra, near the city of Peshawar. They came as soldiers in the armies of the Nawabs of Khambhat. From here, they went to Borsad to afford protection to the local Muslims who were being harassed by the Marathas. The Pashtuns were led by a Musa Khan, who was successful in expelling the Marathas. In gratitude, the local Malik caste chief gave his daughter in marriage, and the village of Raja Mohalla, Gujarat. Musa Khan's descendants are now known as the Sama Pathans. They are a localized community, only found in Borsad and in villages around the town. The community is also in the process of urbanizations, with many migrating to Ahmedabad. They are strictly endogamous, practicing both parallel and cross cousin marriages. On rear occasions, marriages do take place with the Babi Pathans and or rarer with the Malik communities.

Pathan Khanzada

The Khanzada are found in the village of Pandu of Savli tehsil of Baroda District. They are said to have come from Kabul, under the leadership Mahabat Khan Daulat Khanji Khanzada, who was granted the village of Pandu by Sultan Mahmud Begada. They were an influential local rulers until the rise of Gaikwad rulers of Baroda, who annexed their state and reduced to them to the position of jagirdars. They are distinct from other Gujarat Pathans in that they speak Gujarati and not Hindustani.  They are strictly endogamous, not marrying into other Pathan groups. The community practice both cross-cousin and parallel cousin marriages. They are still a landowning community, with many still being fairly large landowners. The Khanzada grow tobacco and sorghum, selling their crops to the traders of Kheda. They have informal caste association, which maintains strict social control over the community.

The Bangash and Zadran

Pathans of the Bangash and Zadran tribes are one of the earliest Pashtun settlers in Gujarat. They were originally settled in the town of Patan by the early sultans of Gujarat on military tenures. They then spread in the districts of Palanpur and Unjha, and played key role in the history of the states of Palanpur and Radhanpur. Unlike other Gujarat Pashtuns, they speak Gujarati. The community are still mainly landowners and cultivators, and are found mainly in Mehsana district.

Galleries

See also
Pashtun
Pashtun diaspora
Pathan of Bihar
Pathans of Rajasthan
Rohilla
Pathans of Uttar Pradesh
Pathans of Punjab

References

Social groups of Gujarat
Social groups of India
Muslim communities of India
Social groups of Pakistan
Muslim communities of Gujarat
Gujarat